Jean Doussard (born 1 July 1928 - 17 December 2015 Vannes - France) is a French conductor.

He was born in Saint-Melaine-sur-Aubance. Doussard began his studies at the Music Conservatory of Angers, and later at the Paris Conservatory, where he was a pupil of Jean Fournet, Paul Van Kempen, and Ferdinand Leitner. He won first prize at the international music competition of Besançon in 1952, and Siena in 1953.

He began his career as conductor of the "Orchestre Radio Symphonique" of Algiers (1953–55). He was then named first conductor of the "International Ballet du Marquis de Cuervas" (1956–61), and with that formation went on tour in China.

After making guest appearances at the Opéra de Lyon and the Opéra de Paris, he became permanent conductor at the opera house of Nancy from 1975 to 1979, and at the Opéra de Lille from 1979 onwards.

Selective discography

 Lecocq - La fille de Madame Angot - (EMI, 1972)
 Planquette - Les cloches de Corneville - (EMI, 1973)
 Johann Strauss II - Valses de Vienne - (EMI, 1971)

Sources 
 Dictionnaire des interprètes, Alain Pâris, (Éditions Robert Laffont, 1989) 

1928 births
French male conductors (music)
Living people
21st-century French conductors (music)
21st-century French male musicians